Sarantaporo is a village and a former municipality in the Larissa regional unit, Thessaly, Greece. Since the 2011 local government reform it is part of the municipality Elassona, of which it is a municipal unit. Population 2,455 (2011). The municipal unit has an area of 150.902 km2, and the community has an area of 26.958 km2. The town is between the mountains of Kamvounia to the northwest and the Pierian Mountains to the northeast. The river Sarantaporos flows through the municipality. Sarantaporo is on the Greek National Road 3 (Larissa - Kozani - Niki). It is located west-southwest of Katerini, northwest of Elassona and Larissa, east of Grevena and south-southeast of Kozani.

Subdivisions
The municipal unit Sarantaporo is subdivided into the following communities (constituent villages in brackets):
Azoros (Vouvala)
Gerania
Giannota
Lykoudi (Lykoudi, Sykia)
Milea
Sarantaporo
Tsapournia (Tsapournia, Farmaki)

Population

History
The village was originally a Slavic settlement founded under the name Glikovo. Unlike the rest of Thessaly, Sarantaporo did not join Greece until October 1912 when the town was liberated from the Ottoman Empire after the Battle of Sarantaporo, a Greek victory in the First Balkan War. The Sarantaporo Gorge was the strategic location for the battle. Sarantaporo became a municipality in 1994; one of the first to be created under the Capodistrian Law. The area features archaeological findings dating back to the pre-Classical years up to the Ottoman rule.

External links
Sarantaporo.gr Non Profit Organization
Sarantaporo municipal unit info at Elassona municipality official web site
Sarantaporo village info at www.elassona.com.gr web portal

References

Populated places in Larissa (regional unit)